The 2022 Connecticut gubernatorial election took place on November 8, 2022, to elect the governor of Connecticut. Incumbent Democratic Governor Ned Lamont ran for re-election to a second term in office. The race simultaneously took place with the election to the state's Class III Senate seat. This election featured a rematch of the previous 2018 gubernatorial election, pitting Lamont against Republican Bob Stefanowski, who he previously defeated by 3.2% of the vote. This time Lamont won re-election by a wider margin, becoming the first Democrat to win a gubernatorial election by more than 5 points in the state since 1986. This is the first time since 1994 that Tolland County voted Democratic in a gubernatorial election.

Democratic convention

Governor

Candidates

Nominee
Ned Lamont, incumbent governor

Lieutenant Governor

Candidates

Nominee
Susan Bysiewicz, incumbent lieutenant governor

Republican convention

Governor

Candidates

Nominee
Bob Stefanowski, businessman and nominee for governor in 2018

Eliminated at convention
Susan Patricelli Regan

Declined
Themis Klarides, former Minority Leader of the Connecticut House of Representatives (running for U.S. Senate)
Jayme Stevenson, Darien First Selectman and candidate for lieutenant governor in 2018 (running for U.S. House)
Erin Stewart, Mayor of New Britain and candidate for governor and lieutenant governor in 2018

Lieutenant Governor

Candidates

Nominee
Laura Devlin, state representative

Third-party candidates and independent candidates

Libertarian Party
Aaron Lewis, founder of The Scribe’s Institute
Running mate: Kevin Skulczyck

Green Party
Michelle Louise Bicking, clinical social worker
Running mate: Cassandra Martineau, social justice activist

Independent Party of Connecticut 
In 2022, the Independent Party nominated its own candidate for governor for the first time ever. In every previous gubernatorial election since its creation, the party had always cross-endorsed the Republican nominee.

Rob Hotaling, technology and business leader
Running mate: Dr. Stewart “Chip” Beckett, veterinarian, former Chairman Capitol Region Council of Governments, Chairman Glastonbury Town Council

Working Families Party 
The Working Families Party endorsed Lamont and Bysiewicz, giving them access to an additional ballot line.
Official designee
Ned Lamont, incumbent governor
Running mate: Susan Bysiewicz, incumbent lieutenant governor

Griebel-Frank for CT Party 
The Griebel-Frank for CT Party, who secured 54,741 votes in the 2018 election and is now affiliated with the Forward Party, gained a ballot line for 2022. In September 2022, the party endorsed Lamont and Bysiewicz, giving them access to an unprecedented three ballot lines for the election.
Official designee
Ned Lamont, incumbent governor
Running mate: Susan Bysiewicz, incumbent lieutenant governor

General election

Predictions

Endorsements

Polling
Aggregate polls

Graphical summary

Ned Lamont vs. Themis Klarides

Ned Lamont vs. generic opponent

Generic Democrat vs. generic Republican

Results

See also
 2022 United States gubernatorial elections

Notes  

Partisan clients

References

External links 
Official campaign websites
 Ned Lamont (D) for Governor
 Aaron Lewis (L) for Governor
 Bob Stefanowski (R) for Governor
 Michelle Louise Bicking (G) for Governor

2022
Connecticut
Gubernatorial